The Price Cutter Charity Championship presented by Dr Pepper is a regular golf tournament on the Korn Ferry Tour. It is played at the Highland Springs Country Club in Springfield, Missouri, United States. It is one of four original Tour events still played.

The 2017 purse was $675,000, with $121,500 going to the winner.

Winners

Bolded golfers graduated to the PGA Tour via the Korn Ferry Tour regular-season money list.

Notes

References

External links

Coverage on the Korn Ferry Tour's official site

Korn Ferry Tour events
Golf in Missouri
Recurring sporting events established in 1990
1990 establishments in Missouri